Lene Kaaberbøl (born in 1960) is a Danish writer born in Copenhagen, Denmark. Her work primarily consists of children's fantasy series and crime fiction for adults. She received the Nordic Children's Book Prize in 2004. In 2009 Kaaberbøl with her co-author Agnete Friis was awarded the Harald Mogensen Prize by the Danish Criminal Academy (Det danske Kriminalakademi, DKA) for novel The boy in the suitcase. In 2018 her Wild Witch (Vildheks) book series (2011–2014) provided the basis for a Danish children's fantasy film of the same name.

Biography 

Born in Copenhagen, Lene Kaaberbøl grew up in the small town of Malling, in the countryside south of Aarhus in Jutland. She got her first book published when she was only 15 years old. It was also the first book of what became the Tina series and it has been translated into Norwegian and Swedish. Graduated from Aarhus Katedralskole and educated with a degree in both English and Dramaturgy from Aarhus University, she has worked as a high school teacher and a translator, but her working life has been very diverse and she also made a living as a cleaning lady at one time. Having resided on Zealand, Kaaberbøl now lives in Sark, in the Channel Islands, close to France.

Bibliography

Translated works

The Shamer Chronicles 
The Shamer's Daughter (Henry Holt and Company, 2006)
The Shamer's Signet (Henry Holt and Company, 2007)
The Serpent Gift (Henry Holt and Company, 2007)
The Shamer's War (Henry Holt and Company, 2008)

Katriona 
Silverhorse (Macmillan Children's Books, 2008)
Midnight (Macmillan Children's Books, 2009)

W.I.T.C.H. 

When Lightning Strikes (Volo, 2004)
Enchanted Music (Volo, 2004)
Heartbreak Island (Volo, 2005)
The Cruel Empress (Volo, 2005)
Stolen Spring (Volo, 2005)
Stenfalken (2003)
Ørnekløer (2003)
Uglens skygge (2003)
Den gyldne fønix (2003)

Nina Borg (with Agnete Friis) 
The Boy in the Suitcase (Soho Crime, 2011)
Invisible Murder (Soho Crime, 2012)
Death of a Nightingale (Soho Crime, 2013)
The Considerate Killer (Soho Crime, 2016)

Madelein Karno 
Doctor Death  (2015)
A lady in shadows

Wild Witch 

Wildfire (Pushkin Press, 2016)
Oblivion (Pushkin Press, 2016)
Life Stealer (Pushkin Press, 2016)
Bloodling (Pushkin Press, 2016)

References

External links
 Official website
 Official Website
 Amazon
 Goodreads
 The Shamer's Daughter
 The Shamer's Signet
 The Shamer's War
 The Serpent's Gift

1960 births
Living people
Danish women writers
Danish children's writers
Danish fantasy writers
Danish women children's writers
Danish crime fiction writers
Women science fiction and fantasy writers